A Night in Compton is an American sex comedy directed and written by Daven Baptiste. It won the Audience Choice Award at the Hollywood Black Film Festival in 2004. The film was theatrically released June 24, 2004.

Plot
The story centers around Lanise Bell, a now skinny but previously fat girl who has drawn the attention of Zion who is home from college on Christmas break. Zion is obsessed with Lanise, who, during the summer, lost 75 pounds at a fat camp. He is bound and determined to seduce her in the one night that he has. In his mind she has to be an easy catch because she has been very vocal about her experiences with other men. Even though Lanise has gained a reputation for being freaky and loose, she is actually a virgin and is only wanting to attract attention. She spends this night creating confusion to avoid Zion's advances.

Cast

 James A. Smith as Zion
 Roscoe as Skinny Dre
 P.R. Banks as Sandra
 Joey Kendricks as Sanford
 Jean David as Mr. Bell
 Desiree Wynn as Lanise Bell
 Joshua Brown as John "Hounddog" Bower
 Patrice Stewart as Emerald
 Mary Christina Brown as Maricar
 Chiquita Fuller as Krystal
 Dwight R. Williams as Edwin
 Tommy "Tiny" Lister as Rainmaker
 Jerome A. Hawkins as El
 Marcelle Larice as Charolette
 Danon Green as Cripple Jr.
 Poppy Davis as Connie

Release

On June 24, 2004, Unyon Media Group released the film in theaters. On September 7, 2004, the film was released on DVD. In Germany, the film was released under the title of Ghetto Christmas.

Awards
A Night in Compton won the Hollywood Black Film Festival 2004 Audience Choice Award.

References

2004 films
American sex comedy films
African-American comedy films
Hood comedy films
2000s sex comedy films
2004 comedy films
2000s American films